The Varanasi–Jaunpur City–Sultanpur–Lucknow line (also known as Varanasi–Lucknow via Sultanpur–Jaunpur main line) is a railway line connecting Varanasi and Lucknow, both in the Indian state of Uttar Pradesh. This line is under the administration of Northern Railway and Lucknow Charbagh Divisions.

History
The Oudh and Rohilkhand Railway opened the  broad gauge line from Varanasi to Lucknow in 1872.

Electrification route via Sultanpur
The Mughalsarai Junction–Varanasi Junction–Jaunpur City–Sultanpur Junction–Lucknow Charbagh railway station line was electrified in 2013.

Sheds, workshops and manufacturing facilities

Lucknow diesel loco shed or Alambagh diesel shed is home to 160+ locomotives, including WDM-2, WDM-3A, WDM-3D, WDG-3A and WDG-4 varieties. Charbagh locomotive workshops handle periodical overhaul jobs. Allahabad has an engineering workshop.

Banaras Locomotive Works at Varanasi initially assembled ALCO kits. Subsequently, under a Transfer of Technology arrangement, the design was adopted by IR and the ALCO design WDM2 locomotive became the mainstay of Indian Railways between the mid-1960s and the late 1990s. Through indigenous efforts, the design was improved and horsepower increased from 2200 to 3600. Subsequently, with technology transfer from GM EMD, it now produces advanced diesel locomotives with high efficiency and low maintenance costs. It produces around 240 locomotives annually. Lately, DLW has started manufacturing electric locomotives also.

References

External links
 Trains at Varanasi
 Trains at Sultanpur
 Trains at Jaunpur City
 Trains at Lucknow Charbagh

5 ft 6 in gauge railways in India
Railway lines opened in 1872
Transport in Varanasi district
Transport in Sultanpur, Uttar Pradesh
Transport in Lucknow
Railway lines in Uttar Pradesh